Butterfly Lovers is a Chinese legend of a tragic love story of a pair of lovers.

Butterfly Lovers may also refer to:
 The Butterfly Lovers (2008 film), a Hong Kong film by Jingle Ma
 Butterfly Lovers (2007 TV series), a Chinese television series
 Butterfly Lovers (album), a 2005 album by Denise Ho
 Butterfly Lovers' Violin Concerto
 The Butterfly Lovers (album), a 2013 album by Hubert Wu

See also
Liangzhu (disambiguation)